Ottawa/Casselman (Shea Field) Aerodrome  is an aerodrome located  east of Ottawa, Ontario, Canada.

See also
 List of airports in the Ottawa area

References

Registered aerodromes in Ontario
Transport in Ottawa